Wilhelm Fritz von Roettig (25 July 1888 – 10 September 1939) was a German general in the Waffen-SS who participated in the invasion of Poland. He was the first general to be killed in World War II. Roettig held the ranks of Generalmajor der Ordnungspolizei and SS-Brigadeführer.

Roettig was killed at about 14:15 on 10 September 1939 aged 51, near Opoczno, Poland. He was killed when his staff car was ambushed by Polish troops armed with heavy machine guns. Roettig was subsequently shot in the head. The next general to die after Roettig was the Polish general Józef Kustroń, who died on 16 September. Subsequently, the next German general to die was Generaloberst Werner von Fritsch, who was killed on 22 September.

As a memorial to him, a street in occupied Prague was named for him during the German occupation of the city.

Sources

1888 births
1939 deaths
Deaths by firearm in Poland
German police chiefs
SS-Brigadeführer
Waffen-SS personnel killed in action